Mafra is a Czech media group that publishes printed and internet media, headquartered in Prague, Czech Republic. It is a subsidiary of Agrofert holding conglomerate owned by trust of Andrej Babiš, the former Prime Minister of the Czech Republic. Mafra owns some of the most popular media in the Czech Republic, including MF DNES and Lidové noviny newspapers, and the most visited Czech news server iDnes.

History
Mafra was founded in 1992 in Prague. It was acquired in 1994 by the German group Rheinisch-Bergische Druckerei- und Verlagsgesellschaft GmbH (RBDV) (the publisher of the Rheinische Post), which bought Mafra from French press group Socpresse. In 2013, Mafra was acquired by Czech holding group Agrofert, which is owned by Andrej Babiš.

MAFRA publishes the daily newspaper Mladá fronta DNES (MF Dnes), which, with 224,000 circulation as of March 2011 is the second largest newspaper in the Czech Republic, after tabloid Blesk. Fully owned subsidiary Lidové noviny, a.s. publishes daily newspaper Lidové noviny with circulation of 44,000, 60% subsidiary Metro Česká republika, a.s. publishes a freesheet Czech edition of Metro with a circulation of 266,000.

The internet division is, as of February 2011, the third most visited Czech website on the internet, with 3.7 million unique visitors per month. It includes web portals iDnes.cz and lidovky.cz, most of its websites being under iDnes.cz.

Other assets include two printing works (in Prague and Olomouc) and the TV music channel Óčko.

During the Covid-19 pandemic, Mafra benefited disproportionately from state aid.

References

External links

 Mafra
 Mafra 

Mass media companies of the Czech Republic
Mass media companies established in 1992
Mass media in Prague
Companies based in Prague